The stabilized liquid membrane device (SLMD) is a passive, integrative sampler that provides an alternative or complementary approach to the conventional water sampling of aqueous metals. The simple device is composed of nonporous low-density plastic lay-flat tubing, which is filled with a chemical mixture containing a chelating agent (metal-binding agent) and a long chain organic acid. The water-insoluble chelating agent-organic acid mixture diffuses in a controlled manner to the exterior surface of the sampler membrane and binds to environmental metals. In practice, the SLMD provides for continuous sequestration of bioavailable forms of trace metals, such as, cadmium (Cd), cobalt (Co), copper (Cu), nickel (Ni), lead (Pb), and zinc (Zn). The SLMD can also be utilized for in-laboratory preconcentration and speciation of bioavailable trace metals from grab water samples.

Use in environmental metal toxicology

Exposure to ionic metals has been shown to result in deleterious effects for aquatic organisms and may induce oxidative stress, cause DNA damage, and decrease enzyme activity. In contrast, some metals under certain environmental conditions have potential moderating effects on other more toxic metals; one example being zinc (Zn), which has been shown to reduce copper (Cu) toxicity when both metals are present. Given that the presence of particular aqueous metals may have a wide array of effects on organisms, aquatic toxicologists have developed various methods for sampling them.

Passive, or in situ, environmental sampling is an important tool used by toxicologists for evaluating toxicants that may exist in very small concentrations—not easily detectable via grab samples. One passive sampler, the semipermeable membrane device, or SPMD, is commonly used to measure organic contaminants in aquatic ecosystems. The SLMD was developed as a counterpart device for sampling metals. Passive sampling for trace metals is more complex than for organic toxicants as most dissolved metals can simultaneously exist in any of several ionic, complex-ion, and organically bound states. Metals can also bind with suspended or dissolved organic matter and exist as ultra-fine colloids, or lipophilic complexes.

First developed by Petty, Brumbaugh, Huckins, May, and Wiedmeyer, the SLMD is used to monitor ionic metals in aquatic environments. Due to anthropogenic factors such as mining, metal refining, and industrial activity, global emissions of metals has significantly increased within the last 100 years, and will likely continue to increase during the foreseeable future.

Components and functions

The simple device can be created in the laboratory using a nonporous polymeric tube, such as low-density polyethylene (LDPE) plastic. A sequestration medium within the tube slowly defuses through the membrane, binding to ionic metals creating non-mobile metals species that can later be extracted from the other membrane. The sequestration medium generally consists of a metal binding agent, or chelating agent, and a long chain organic acid, commonly oleic acid.

The SLMD tube is flat with a membrane thickness that can vary between 2 and 500 μm depending on the application. The approximate width of the SLMD is 2.5 cm and approximate length is 15 cm (these dimensions may vary based on application). The sequestration medium reagent is typically composed of an equal mixture of oleic acid (cis-9-octadecenoic acid) and Kelex-100 (ethyl-methyl-octyl, 8-quinolinol), however other chemicals may be used to perform similar functions.

After deployment, the immobilized metal species can then be extracted from the outer membrane. The metal species can be identified and analyzed using widely recognized standard techniques (e.g., digestion, atomic absorption spectroscopy, inductively coupled plasma mass spectrometry, etc.). In this regard, any procedure or analytical technique applicable to measuring ionic or complexed metal species is suitable for determining metal concentrations sequestered by the SLMD.

References 

Membrane technology